Kpist, short for kulsprutepistol, is a Swedish abbreviation for submachine gun.  The name may refer to:

 the Carl Gustav M/45, also known as the Kpist m/45, a Swedish submachine gun used by American special operations forces during the Vietnam War.
 Kpist (band), a Swedish electronic rock band